Jacqueline Govaert (born 20 April 1982) is a Dutch singer, songwriter, and pianist. She is best known as the leader of Dutch band Krezip. 
After Krezip disbanded in 2009, Govaert started a solo music career. She released her debut album Good Life in August 2010.

Musical career

Krezip

Govaert wrote her first songs on the piano at age 12. She graduated from the Dutch Rockacademy in Tilburg. Prior to that, she had started the band Krezip in high school. The band released their first EP in 1999; it was an independent release. In 2000, the band was signed by Warner Music and played at Lowlands and Pinkpop. In the same year their first LP came out, gaining considerable success that continued until they disbanded in 2009.

Govaert was the band's main songwriter. She was also the band's pianist until guitarist Annelies Kuijsters was forced to take over this role, having lost her ability to play guitar after a severe injury. Govaert enjoyed giving up her role as pianist, noting "...now I can concentrate on my performance."

Govaert served as a featured artist on tracks of the music project Ayreon, Dutch band Relax (on the album Odeur de Clochard), Armin van Buuren and Fernando Lameirinhas.

In 2006, Govaert contributed on a theme song for the TMF Awards of 2006. For this song, she collaborated with Dutch bands The Partysquad, Extince and Caprice. They performed the song at the opening of the award ceremony.

Govaert also co-wrote, with singer Alain Clark, the song 'Wherever I Go, which was used in the Dutch Senseo commercial and then released as a single.

Solo career
After quitting Krezip, Govaert announced that she would be pursuing a solo music career. 
She released her debut solo album, Good Life, in August 2010. She worked on the album with Jan Peter Hoekstra (guitar Krezip), Joost Zweegers (Novastar), Tjeerd Bomhof (frontman Voicst) and Alex Callier (bass and songwriter Hooverphonic). Musicians on Good Life were Mario Goossens (drums Hooverphonic, Triggerfinger), Simon Casier (bass Balthazar), Jan Peter Hoekstra (guitar ex-Krezip) and Remko Kühne (keys Hooverphonic, Alain Clark).
The album entered the Dutch Album Charts on 3 September 2010 at number three.

Personal life
Govaert resides in Haarlem with her partner.
On 29 October 2008, Govaert announced that she was expecting a child, and that she was taking a hiatus from the music industry. Govaert gave birth to a son, on 26 March 2009. 
Govaert's second child, a daughter, was born on 10 November 2010. Jacqueline is the older sister of Onno Govaert, who is a drummer mainly active in the field of improvised music.

Discography

Albums with Krezip
 Run Around (1999)
 Nothing Less (2000)
 Days Like This (2002)
 That'll Be Unplugged (2003)
 What Are You Waiting For? (2005)
 Plug It In (2007)
 Best Of (2008)
 Sweet High (2019)

Solo albums

Chart positions

Albums

|-
|align="left"|Good Life||30-08-2010||04-09-2010||3||24||
|-
|align="left"|Songs to Soothe||24-03-2014||29-03-2014||1||19||
|-
|align="left"|Lighthearted Years||20-10-2017||28-10-2017||9||||
|}

Singles

|-
|align="left"|"Abraça-Me" / "Omhels me dan"||2006||-|||||| with Fernando Lameirinhas / #35 in Single Top 100
|-
|align="left"|"TMF Awards Anthem 2006"||2006||16-12-2006||tip8||-|| with Partysquad, Extince, Caprice / #4 in de Single Top 100
|-
|align="left"|"Never Say Never"||2009||11-07-2009||21||6|| with Armin van Buuren / #32 in Single Top 100
|-
|align="left"|"Overrated"||12-07-2010||17-07-2010||12||11|| #28 in Single Top 100
|-
|align="left"|"Big World"||2010||27-11-2010||29||5||
|-
|align="left"|"Hold Your Fire"||2011||19-02-2011||tip11||-||
|-
|align="left"|"Wherever I Go"||2011||09-04-2011||tip2||-|| with Alain Clark / #33 in Single Top 100
|}

Guest appearances

 Universal Migrator Part 1: The Dream Sequencer (Ayreon, 2000) "Temple Of The Cat"
 76 (Armin van Buuren, 2003) "Stay"
 Odeur de Clochard (Relax, 2005) "Dream On"
 Just Like You (SMD, 2008)
 Imagine (Armin van Buuren, 2008) "Never Say Never"

References

External links
 
 Jacqueline Govaert - Homepage
 Jacqueline Govaert - BBC Profile
 Jacqueline Govaert - Discogs Profile
 Jacqueline Govaert - LastFm Profile
 Jacqueline Govaert - MusicBrainz Profile
 Jacqueline Govaert - Twitter Profile

1982 births
Living people
Dutch rock pianists
Dutch rock singers
People from Loon op Zand
English-language singers from the Netherlands
21st-century Dutch singers
21st-century Dutch women singers
21st-century pianists
21st-century women pianists